Vittaria ensiformis, commonly known as the tape fern, is a species of epiphytic fern. In eastern Australia, it grows in rainforests north from the Watagan Hills in the south, to tropical Queensland and the Northern Territory in the north. This plant first appeared in scientific literature in 1799, published by the Swedish botanist Olof Swartz from a plant collected in Mauritius.

References 

Pteridaceae
Flora of New South Wales
Flora of Queensland
Flora of the Northern Territory
Flora of tropical Asia
Flora of Africa
Flora of Madagascar
Flora of Mauritius
Taxa named by Olof Swartz